Virbia hypophaea is a moth in the family Erebidae. It was described by George Hampson in 1901. It is found in Costa Rica and Brazil.

Subspecies
Virbia hypophaea hypophaea (Costa Rica)
Virbia hypophaea tenuimargo Rothschild, 1922 (Brazil)

References

Moths described in 1901
hypophaea